AdventHealth Shawnee Mission (formerly Shawnee Mission Medical Center), is a 504-bed hospital with attendant outpatient services, owned by the AdventHealth hospital system, located in Merriam in Johnson County, Kansas. In addition to the hospital itself it has a free-standing outpatient surgery, a community health education building, five physician office buildings and an associate child care center. The hospital is part of AdventHealth, a health care organization headquartered in Altamonte Springs, Florida, which in turn is owned by the Seventh-day Adventist Protestant religious denomination.

History 
The institution that would become AdventHealth Shawnee Mission was founded in 1955 when local leaders, medical professionals from the Johnson County Medical Society, and members of the New Haven Seventh-day Adventist Church in Overland Park, Kansas, came together to address the developing population's healthcare needs in Johnson County. The 102-bed nursing care facility, Pleasantview Health and Vocation Institute, opened in 1961. This facility formed the foundation of the modern hospital. Shawnee Mission Hospital opened with 65 acute care beds in May 1962. An additional 70 acute-care beds, as well as more space for expanded diagnostic and therapeutic services, were added in 1966.

Shawnee Mission Hospital was renamed Shawnee Mission Medical Center in 1971. In 1972, ownership of the hospital was transferred to the Seventh-Day Adventist denomination, and it was placed under the direction of the Central (now Mid-America) Union Conference. The bed count at the time was 241, and due to the urgent need for acute care, these beds were converted to acute care beds in January 1975. By 1982, the total number of acute care beds had risen to 383. New maternity, cardiac care, women's services, and outpatient facilities were added in 1991 and 1992. Shawnee Mission Medical Center became affiliated with Saint Luke's Health System in 1996. This affiliation lasted until November 2002, when Shawnee Mission Medical Center became a part of the Altamonte Springs, Florida-based Adventist Health System.

The hospital received a $114 million expansion that added 265,000 square feet in 2009, including a new emergency department, cardiac care unit (CCU), intensive care unit (ICU), surgery floor, and main entrance. The emergency room was tripled in size and capacity, and four operating rooms were added. The last two floors of this expansion were completed in 2011. The Shawnee Mission Birth Center, which tripled the size of the previous birth center, opened on the Shawnee Mission Medical Center campus in February 2013. A 24-bed Level III Neonatal Intensive Care Unit (NICU) with private, single-family rooms was included in the expansion. In January 2019, Shawnee Mission Medical Center rebranded itself as AdventHealth Shawnee Mission. In April of that same year, the hospital added the 62,000 square foot B. E. Smith Family Center to its campus to house its Britain Development and Early Learning programs.

Hospital rating data 
The HealthGrades website contains the latest quality data for Shawnee Mission Medical Center, as of 2016. For this rating section three different types of data from HealthGrades are presented: quality ratings for thirty-two inpatient conditions and procedures, thirteen patient safety indicators and the percentage of patients giving the hospital a 9 or 10 (the two highest possible ratings).

For inpatient conditions and procedures, there are three possible ratings: worse than expected, as expected, better than expected.  For this hospital the data for this category is:
Worse than expected - 2
As expected - 28
Better than expected - 2
For patient safety indicators, there are the same three possible ratings. For this hospital safety indicators were rated as:
Worse than expected - 1
As expected - 5
Better than expected - 7
Percentage of patients rating this hospital as a 9 or 10: 83%.
Percentage of patients who, on average, rank hospitals as a 9 or 10: 69%

AdventHealth Shawnee Mission ranked fourth by Fortune in their list of 100 Top Hospitals in 2022.

See also 

List of Seventh-day Adventist hospitals

References

External links 
 

Hospital buildings completed in 1962
Hospitals in Kansas
AdventHealth
Buildings and structures in Johnson County, Kansas
1962 establishments in Kansas